is a 1943 Japanese film directed by Koga Masato. It tells the story of Tani Yutaka, known as "Harimau" (Malay word for "Tiger") who was a secret agent for the Japanese military who died in a hospital in Singapore. It is debatable that Tani Yutaka is the true "Harimau Malaya" or "The Tiger of Malaya" and not Tomoyuki Yamashita.

Cast 
 Koji Nakata as Tani Yutaka
 Ryo Akaboshi as farmer

References

External links 
 
 Malaya’s Other Tiger at malayablackandwhite
 The Many Lives of the Tiger of Malaya at malayablackandwhite

Japanese black-and-white films
1943 films
Daiei Film films
Japanese war drama films
1940s war drama films
1943 drama films
Japanese World War II films